Marek Kaščák (born 22 May 1982) is a Slovak footballer who plays for 1. HFK Olomouc. Besides Slovakia, he has played in the Czech Republic.

International career
Kaščák made his national team debut in a 1–2 home defeat against Denmark on 29 March 2011.

References

External links
 Profile at iDNES.cz 
 Guardian Football

1982 births
Living people
People from Bardejov
Sportspeople from the Prešov Region
Association football midfielders
Slovak footballers
Partizán Bardejov players
FK Dukla Banská Bystrica players
SK Sigma Olomouc players
AS Trenčín players
FC Spartak Trnava players
Slovak Super Liga players
Czech First League players
Slovak expatriate footballers
Expatriate footballers in the Czech Republic
Slovak expatriate sportspeople in the Czech Republic
Slovakia international footballers
FC Zbrojovka Brno players
1. HFK Olomouc players